Richard J. Cottrell (born 11 July 1943) is an English politician and author who was a Member of the European Parliament for the British constituency of Bristol from 1979 until 1989.

Biography 
Richard J. Cottrell was born on 11 July 1943 in Wellington, Somerset.

He was elected to the Parliament in 1979 for the Conservative Party, and started his service on 17 July 1979. During his first term, he joined the Committee on Transport on 20 July of the same year and the Committee on Youth, Culture, Education, Information and Sport on 11 July 1980, serving on both until the Parliament adjourned on 23 July 1984.

He was re-elected in 1984, again for the Conservative Party, and served until 24 July 1989. He served as a member of the committees for the Rules of Procedure, the Verification of Credencials [sic] and Immunities; the Rules of Procedure and Petitions; and the Environment, Public Health and Consumer Protection; and also participated in diplomatic relations with Canada and the People's Republic of China.

He lost re-election in 1989 to Labour Party candidate Ian White.

Bibliography
The Sacred Cow: Folly of Europe's Food Mountains, 1987 
Blood on their Hands: Killing of Ann Chapman, 1988 
Gladio: NATO’s Dagger at the Heart of Europe, 2012 
Doctor Who? The Atomic Bomber Beeching and his War on the Railways., 2013

References

1943 births
People from Wellington, Somerset
Conservative Party (UK) MEPs
MEPs for England 1979–1984
MEPs for England 1984–1989
English writers
Living people